Suhl is a town in Thuringia, Germany.

Suhl may also refer to:

 Bezirk Suhl, a district of the GDR
 Suhl (Weihe), a river of Thuringia and Hesse, Germany, tributary of the Weihe
 Suhl (Werra), a river of Thuringia, Germany, tributary of the Werra
 Sunshine Hockey League (SuHL)

People with that surname
 Eckart Suhl (born 1943), German field hockey player
 Harry Suhl (born 1922), German-American physicist
 Sebastian Suhl (born 1969), American fashion industry executive